Alvear may refer to:

People
Alvear (surname)

Other
General Alvear (disambiguation)
Alvear, Corrientes
Alvear, Santa Fe
Avenida Alvear